John Dexter (2 August 1925 – 23 March 1990) was an English theatre, opera and film director.

Theatre 

Born in Derby, Derbyshire, England, Dexter left school at the age of fourteen to serve in the British Army during the Second World War. Following the war, he began working as a stage actor before turning to producing and directing shows for repertory companies. In 1957, he was appointed Associate Director of the English Stage Company based at the Royal Court.

Dexter's first great success was his production of Roots, in 1959, which brought Joan Plowright to prominence. He went on to direct Toys in the Attic (with Wendy Hiller, 1960) and Saint Joan (1963). In 1964, he was named Associate Director of the National Theatre of Great Britain, and he produced The Royal Hunt of the Sun (1964).

That year, he also directed Othello, with Sir Laurence Olivier, Maggie Smith and Frank Finlay. It was considered a tremendous success. RCA recorded an audio version, and, the following year, Stuart Burge made a film of the production (now available on DVD) for BHE Films.

Dexter continued with Hamlet (with music by Conrad Susa, 1969), Equus (one of his triumphs, 1973), Trevor Griffiths's The Party (Lord Olivier's final stage appearance, 1973), Phaedra Britannica (with his friend, Diana Rigg, 1975), The Merchant (aka, Shylock, 1977), As You Like It (with music by Harrison Birtwistle, 1979), Life of Galileo (with Sir Michael Gambon, 1980), The Glass Menagerie (with Jessica Tandy, 1983) and Julius Caesar (1988). His final great success was M. Butterfly (1988), on Broadway, and the following year, he staged Die Dreigroschenoper there (with Sting as Macheath), which was to be his final production.

Cinema 

Dexter's debut feature-film was The Virgin Soldiers (with Lynn Redgrave, 1969). His second film was The Sidelong Glances of a Pigeon Kicker (aka, Pigeons, with Elaine Stritch, 1970); his third was I Want What I Want (1972).

For Granada Television, Dexter directed Twelfth Night, with Sir Alec Guinness and Sir Ralph Richardson in 1969.

Opera 
Dexter made his operatic debut at the Royal Opera, Covent Garden, in 1966, with Benvenuto Cellini, with Nicolai Gedda, and, in 1983, he staged a double-bill of Le rossignol (with Natalia Makarova) and L'enfant et les sortilèges for the company. At the Hamburg State Opera, he staged Les vêpres siciliennes (1969), From the House of the Dead (1972), Billy Budd (with Richard Stilwell, 1972), Boris Godunov (in the Shostakovich edition, 1972) and Un ballo in maschera (with Luciano Pavarotti and Sherrill Milnes, 1973). For Sadler's Wells, he produced The Devils of Loudun in 1973.

At the Metropolitan Opera (where he was Director of Production from 1974 to 1981, then Production Advisor from 1981 to 1984), Dexter mounted new productions of Les vêpres siciliennes (with Montserrat Caballé, 1974), Aïda (with Leontyne Price, 1976), Le prophète (with Marilyn Horne, 1977), Dialogues des Carmélites (1977), Lulu (1977), Rigoletto (with Cornell MacNeil and Plácido Domingo, 1977), Billy Budd (with Sir Peter Pears, 1978), The Bartered Bride (with Teresa Stratas and Jon Vickers, 1978), Don Pasquale (with Beverly Sills, 1978), Don Carlos (with Renata Scotto, 1979), Die Entführung aus dem Serail (with Edda Moser, later Zdzisława Donat, 1979), Aufstieg und Fall der Stadt Mahagonny (1979) and the triple-bills (both designed by David Hockney) of "Parade" (Parade/Les mamelles de Tirésias/L'enfant et les sortilèges, 1981) and "Stravinsky" (Le sacre du printemps/Le rossignol/Œdipus rex, 1981).

For the Paris Opéra, he staged Les vêpres siciliennes (1974) and La forza del destino (1975).

In Zurich, he produced Nabucco in 1986.

Life 

John Dexter died in London during heart surgery; he had also been afflicted with poliomyelitis and diabetes. His acerbic and witty autobiography, The Honourable Beast, was published posthumously, in which he wrote of his "Fury for perfection...."

Broadway productions
The Threepenny Opera (1989 revival)
M. Butterfly (1988)
The Glass Menagerie (1983 revival)
One Night Stand (1980, "never officially opened")
 The Merchant (1977)
The Misanthrope (1975 revival)
Equus (1974)
The Unknown Soldier and His Wife (1967)
Black Comedy/White Lies (1967)
The Royal Hunt of the Sun (1965)Do I Hear a Waltz? (1965)Chips With Everything (1963)

Awards and nominations

Notes

 References 
 Dexter, John. (1993). The Honourable Beast: A Posthumous Autobiography. London: Nick Hern Books. ;  OCLC 28642052
 Hiley, Jim. (1981). Theatre at work: The story of the National Theatre's production of Brecht's "Galileo".'' London: Routledge & Kegan Paul. ; ;  OCLC 7883761

External links
 

1925 births
1990 deaths
Drama Desk Award winners
English film directors
English theatre directors
British opera directors
People from Derby
Tony Award winners
English directors